The castra of Gresia was a fort in the Roman province of Dacia. Existing in the 2nd and 3rd centuries AD, its ruins are located in Gresia (commune Stejaru, Romania).

See also
List of castra

Notes

External links
Roman castra from Romania - Google Maps / Earth
Archaeological Excavations in Romania, 1983-2011: Preliminary Archaeological Reports (Archaeological Excavation Report, Gresia)

Roman legionary fortresses in Romania
History of Muntenia
Historic monuments in Teleorman County